The 1978 Jackson State Tigers football team represented Jackson State University as a member of the Southwestern Athletic Conference (SWAC) during the 1978 NCAA Division I-AA football season. Led by third-year head coach W. C. Gorden, the Tigers compiled an overall record of 10–2 with a mark of 5–1 in conference play, placing second in the SWAC. Jackson State advanced to the NCAA Division I-AA Football Championship playoffs, where the lost in the semifinals to the eventual national champion, Florida A&M.

Schedule

References

Jackson State
Jackson State Tigers football seasons
Jackson State Tigers football